HD 106315, also known as K2-109, is a F-type main-sequence star about 340 light-years away. The star is relatively metal-poor, having 60% of solar concentration of iron.

Multiplicity surveys did not detect any stellar companions to HD 106315 by 2020.

Planetary system
Two planets were detected by transit method in 2017. The large planetary radii imply both planets have a massive steam atmosphere for planet b and hydrogen-helium atmosphere for planet c. The planetary system of HD 106315 is rather unstable and current planetary orbits are the outcome of violent dynamical history, strongly affected by relativistic effects. The orbits of planets are nearly coplanar, and orbit of c is well aligned with the equatorial plane of the star, misalignment been equal to -10°.

Since 2017, third outer planet with mass above 45 is suspected to exist in the system.

References

Virgo (constellation)
F-type main-sequence stars
Planetary systems with two confirmed planets
Planetary transit variables
BD+00 2910|
J12135339-0023365
106315